Dufton Pike is a hill in the northern Pennines, in Cumbria, England. It is classed as a Marilyn (a hill with topographic prominence of at least 150m). It rises above the village of Dufton.

Marilyns of England
Mountains and hills of the Pennines
Mountains and hills of Cumbria
Dufton